Lorena Cuéllar Cisneros (born 20 February 1962) is a Mexican politician affiliated with the National Regeneration Movement (MORENA) who serves as the Governor of Tlaxcala. Formerly she served as a member of the Labor Party (PT) as a federal deputy in the LXIV Legislature of the Mexican Congress representing Tlaxcala; she had previously been a senator and mayor of the state capital of Tlaxcala.

Political career

Cuéllar was born in Tlaxcala, Tlaxcala, Mexico in 20 February 1962. In 1991, Cuéllar joined the Institutional Revolutionary Party (PRI). While a PRI member, she served as the president of the local chapter of the National System for Integral Family Development (DIF) in Tlaxcala City between 1992 and 1994; she also was a city councilor there from 2002 and 2005 and was elected the city's mayor in 2008. Additionally, she served a term in the Tlaxcala state legislature between 2005 and 2007.

In 2010, she made a bid to secure the PRI nomination for governor; in 2011, in her second stint as a state legislator, she tried again, this time to be a PRI senate candidate. This bid did not prosper, and citing a conflict with Governor Mariano González Zarur that left her out in the cold within the party, Cuéllar left the PRI in January 2012 and ran as the Party of the Democratic Revolution (PRD) coalition candidate, winning election to the Senate of the Republic. She sat on a total of five commissions, including a post as president of the Social Development Commission between September 27, 2012, and February 26, 2016.

Cuéllar took leave from the Senate in February 2016 in order to run as the PRD candidate for Governor of Tlaxcala; after a two-percentage-point loss to the PRI coalition candidate Marco Antonio Mena Rodríguez, she returned to the Senate. In April 2017, she and two other legislators left the PRD and, alongside independents and members of the National Regeneration Movement (Morena), joined the PT caucus in a spat over commission seats, in which the party motioned to remove a senator who had recently left the PRD from the chamber's Administration Commission and replace her with new party president Alejandra Barrales; the defections swelled the PT's ranks from 7 to 16 senators.

In 2018, Cuéllar ran as the Juntos Haremos Historia coalition's candidate for federal deputy from Tlaxcala's third federal electoral district, which covers the southern part of the state. She was also included on Morena's party list, in the third position from the fourth electoral region, assuring her of a seat either way. Cuéllar has also been tapped by the incoming Morena federal government, which takes office on December 1, to coordinate the federal government's presence in Tlaxcala, which means she will take leave of her seat within months of being sworn in.

References

1962 births
Living people
People from Tlaxcala City
Women members of the Senate of the Republic (Mexico)
Members of the Senate of the Republic (Mexico)
Labor Party (Mexico) politicians
21st-century Mexican politicians
21st-century Mexican women politicians
Politicians from Tlaxcala
Autonomous University of Tlaxcala alumni
Members of the Congress of Tlaxcala
Municipal presidents in Tlaxcala
Governors of Tlaxcala